Ousha bint Khalifa Al Suwaidi also known as Fatat Al-Arab (Girl of the Arabs), Ousha Al Sha'er (Ousha the Poet) (1 January 1920 – 27 July 2018) was a poetess from the United Arab Emirates.

Early life and education
Ousha was born and raised in Al Ain and moved later in life to the emirate of Dubai. A prominent cultural figure, she is regarded as among the finest Arabic Nabati poets with a large number of her poems sung by popular Emirati and Arab artists. Her work has been influential in the development of Nabati poetry in the UAE, particularly among young female poets.

Works
Her work was influenced by both classical poets such as Al Mutannabi, Abu Tammam and Al Ma’ari, as well as local Nabati poets including Al Majidi bin Thahir, Rashid Al Khalawi, Saleem bin Abdul Hai and Mohsin Hazzani.

In 1989, Sheikh Mohammed bin Rashid Al Maktoum, Crown Prince of Dubai at the time, dedicated a poem from his first published collection giving her the sobriquet "Fatat Al Arab" instead of her original name "Fatat Al Khaleej" (Girl of the Gulf).

Awards
In 2010, she was awarded at the 11th Sharjah Festival of Classic Poetry and later won the Abu Dhabi award, presented by Sheikh Mohammed Bin Zayed Al Nahyan. In 2011 an annual award for female Emirati poets was established in her name and a section in her honour was dedicated in Dubai's Women's Museum. A biography of Ousha was published by Rafia Ghubash, the President of the Arabian Gulf University in Bahrain. She was awarded with Abu Dhabi Awards for her services in 2009.

On 28 November 2022, she was celebrated with a Google Doodle. Google doodle image was illustrated by Abu Dhabi-based artist Reem Al Mazrouei.

References

1920 births
2018 deaths
21st-century Emirati poets
People from Al Ain
20th-century Emirati poets
Emirati women poets